Aliabad-e Karvan (also Romanized as ‘Alīābād-e Karvan and ‘Alīābād Karown; also known as ‘Alīābād and Ali Abad Karon) is a village in Karvan-e Sofla Rural District, Karvan District, Tiran and Karvan County, Isfahan Province, Iran. At the 2006 census, its population was 635, in 210 families.

References 

Populated places in Tiran and Karvan County